KFOG may refer to:

 KFOG (AM), a radio station (1250 AM) licensed to serve Little Rock, Arkansas, United States
 KNBR-FM, a radio station (104.5 FM) licensed to serve San Francisco, California, United States, which held the call sign KFOG from 1964 to 2019